Bentsen-Rio Grande Valley State Park is located at 2800 S. Bentsen Palm Drive (FM 2062)
south of the city of Mission in  Hidalgo County in the U.S. state of Texas.  It serves as the headquarters for the World Birding Center.

History
The park had its beginnings on January 28, 1944, when the parents of Senator Lloyd Bentsen, Lloyd M. Bentsen Sr. and his wife Edna Ruth Bentsen,  along with Elmer and Marie Bentsen, donated  of land to the State Parks Board for a nature habitat. The park currently encompasses 

The park has become a prime area for bird watching and butterfly watching. When the Bentsen-Rio Grande Valley State Park became the headquarters of the World Birding Center's network of nine sites in 2004, vehicular traffic was banned and RV camping was no longer allowed in the park. The other sites, all located in south Texas, include Edinburg Scenic Wetlands;  Harlingen Arroyo Colorado, Resaca de la Palma State Park, Roma Bluffs, Quinta Mazatlan, Old Hidalgo Pumphouse Nature Park,  Estero Llano Grande State Park, South Padre Island Birding and Nature Center. More than 325 species of birds, and more than 250 species of butterflies have been noted in the Bentsen park. The park is popular to butterfly watchers. The North American Butterfly Association operates the National Butterfly Center adjacent to the park.

Facilities, hours, admission
Entrance fee

The park is open year-round. Park tram available

Y Cafe, Texas State Parks Store

Exhibits, hiking trail, cycling, birdwatching,  butterfly watching, picnicking, tent camping, meeting facilities

See also

Museums in South Texas
National Register of Historic Places listings in Hidalgo County, Texas

References

External links
TPWD: official Bentsen-Rio Grande State Park website
Bentsen-Rio Grande State Park and World Birding Center
City of Mission, Texas official site
Video segment on the Bentsen-Rio Grande State Park from Exploring the Texas State Parks System on Texas Archive of the Moving Image

State parks of Texas
Nature centers in Texas
Protected areas of Hidalgo County, Texas
Lower Rio Grande Valley